These 309 species belong to the genus Glyptapanteles, braconid wasps.

Glyptapanteles species

 Glyptapanteles acasta (Nixon, 1973)
 Glyptapanteles acherontiae (Cameron, 1907)
 Glyptapanteles acraeae (Wilkinson, 1932)
 Glyptapanteles afiamaluanus (Fullaway, 1941)
 Glyptapanteles africanus (Cameron, 1911)
 Glyptapanteles aggestus (Granger, 1949)
 Glyptapanteles agrotivorus Whitfield, 2002
 Glyptapanteles agynus (de Saeger, 1944)
 Glyptapanteles aithos (Sharma, 1973)
 Glyptapanteles alejandrovalerioi Arias-Penna, 2019
 Glyptapanteles aletta (Nixon, 1973)
 Glyptapanteles alexborisenkoi Arias-Penna, 2019
 Glyptapanteles alexwildi Arias-Penna, 2019
 Glyptapanteles aliphera (Nixon, 1973)
 Glyptapanteles alticola (Ashmead, 1902)
 Glyptapanteles alvarowillei Arias-Penna, 2019
 Glyptapanteles amenophis (de Saeger, 1944)
 Glyptapanteles andrewdebeveci Arias-Penna, 2019
 Glyptapanteles andybennetti Arias-Penna, 2019
 Glyptapanteles andydeansi Arias-Penna, 2019
 Glyptapanteles andysuarezi Arias-Penna, 2019
 Glyptapanteles andywarreni Arias-Penna, 2019
 Glyptapanteles ankitaguptae Arias-Penna, 2019
 Glyptapanteles annettewalkerae Arias-Penna, 2019
 Glyptapanteles antarctiae (Blanchard, 1935)
 Glyptapanteles antinoe (Nixon, 1973)
 Glyptapanteles antsirabensis (Granger, 1949)
 Glyptapanteles anubis (de Saeger, 1944)
 Glyptapanteles arcuatus (Telenga, 1955)
 Glyptapanteles arginae (Bhatnagar, 1950)
 Glyptapanteles argus (de Saeger, 1944)
 Glyptapanteles aristolochiae (Wilkinson, 1928)
 Glyptapanteles artonae (Rohwer, 1926)
 Glyptapanteles ashmeadi (Wilkinson, 1928)
 Glyptapanteles atylana (Nixon, 1965)
 Glyptapanteles aucklandensis (Cameron, 1909)
 Glyptapanteles badgleyi (Wilkinson, 1928)
 Glyptapanteles barneyburksi Arias-Penna, 2019
 Glyptapanteles bataviensis (Rohwer, 1919)
 Glyptapanteles betogarciai Arias-Penna, 2019
 Glyptapanteles bidentatus (Sharma, 1972)
 Glyptapanteles billbrowni Arias-Penna, 2019
 Glyptapanteles bimus Papp, 1990
 Glyptapanteles bistonis (Watanabe, 1934)
 Glyptapanteles bobhanneri Arias-Penna, 2019
 Glyptapanteles bobkulai Arias-Penna, 2019
 Glyptapanteles bobwhartoni Arias-Penna, 2019
 Glyptapanteles boharti Arias-Penna, 2019
 Glyptapanteles borocerae (Granger, 1949)
 Glyptapanteles bourquini (Blanchard, 1936)
 Glyptapanteles breviscuta Song & Chen, 2004
 Glyptapanteles brianestjaquesae Arias-Penna, 2019
 Glyptapanteles caberatae (Muesebeck, 1956)
 Glyptapanteles cacao (Wilkinson, 1934)
 Glyptapanteles cadei (Risbec, 1951)
 Glyptapanteles caffreyi (Muesebeck, 1921)
 Glyptapanteles callidus (Haliday, 1834)
 Glyptapanteles capeki (Györfi, 1955)
 Glyptapanteles carinachicaizae Arias-Penna, 2019
 Glyptapanteles carinatus (Szépligeti, 1913)
 Glyptapanteles carlhuffakeri Arias-Penna, 2019
 Glyptapanteles carlossarmientoi Arias-Penna, 2019
 Glyptapanteles carlrettenmeyeri Arias-Penna, 2019
 Glyptapanteles cassianus (Riley, 1881)
 Glyptapanteles celsoazevedoi Arias-Penna, 2019
 Glyptapanteles charlesmicheneri Arias-Penna, 2019
 Glyptapanteles charlesporteri Arias-Penna, 2019
 Glyptapanteles chidra Rousse & Gupta, 2013
 Glyptapanteles chrisdarlingi Arias-Penna, 2019
 Glyptapanteles chrisgrinteri Arias-Penna, 2019
 Glyptapanteles christerhanssoni Arias-Penna, 2019
 Glyptapanteles cinyras (de Saeger, 1944)
 Glyptapanteles clanisae Gupta, 2013
 Glyptapanteles claudiamartinezae Arias-Penna, 2019
 Glyptapanteles colemani (Viereck, 1912)
 Glyptapanteles compressiventris (Muesebeck, 1921)
 Glyptapanteles compressus (Muesebeck, 1919)
 Glyptapanteles concinnus (Muesebeck, 1958)
 Glyptapanteles corbetti (Wilkinson, 1928)
 Glyptapanteles corriemoreauae Arias-Penna, 2019
 Glyptapanteles creatonoti (Viereck, 1912)
 Glyptapanteles dalosoma de Santis, 1987
 Glyptapanteles darjeelingensis (Sharma & Chatterjee, 1970)
 Glyptapanteles daveroubiki Arias-Penna, 2019
 Glyptapanteles daveschindeli Arias-Penna, 2019
 Glyptapanteles davesmithi Arias-Penna, 2019
 Glyptapanteles davidwahli Arias-Penna, 2019
 Glyptapanteles deliasa Austin & Dangerfield, 1992
 Glyptapanteles diegocamposi Arias-Penna, 2019
 Glyptapanteles distatus Papp, 1990
 Glyptapanteles donquickei Arias-Penna, 2019
 Glyptapanteles dorislagosae Arias-Penna, 2019
 Glyptapanteles ecuadorius Whitfield, 2002
 Glyptapanteles edgardpalacioi Arias-Penna, 2019
 Glyptapanteles edwinnarvaezi Arias-Penna, 2019
 Glyptapanteles eowilsoni Arias-Penna, 2019
 Glyptapanteles erictepei Arias-Penna, 2019
 Glyptapanteles eryphanidis (Whitfield, 2011)
 Glyptapanteles eucosmae (Wilkinson, 1929)
 Glyptapanteles euproctisiphagus (Ahmad, 1945)
 Glyptapanteles eutelus (de Saeger, 1941)
 Glyptapanteles fabiae (Wilkinson, 1928)
 Glyptapanteles felipesotoi Arias-Penna, 2019
 Glyptapanteles femoratus Ashmead, 1906
 Glyptapanteles ferfernandezi Arias-Penna, 2019
 Glyptapanteles ficus (Granger, 1949)
 Glyptapanteles flavicoxis (Marsh, 1979)
 Glyptapanteles flavovariatus (Muesebeck, 1921)
 Glyptapanteles floridanus (Muesebeck, 1921)
 Glyptapanteles fraternus (Reinhard, 1880)
 Glyptapanteles fullawayi Austin & Dangerfield, 1992
 Glyptapanteles fulvigaster (Granger, 1949)
 Glyptapanteles fulvipes (Haliday, 1834)
 Glyptapanteles fuscinervis (Cameron, 1911)
 Glyptapanteles gahinga (de Saeger, 1944)
 Glyptapanteles garygibsoni Arias-Penna, 2019
 Glyptapanteles gavinbroadi Arias-Penna, 2019
 Glyptapanteles genorodriguezae Arias-Penna, 2019
 Glyptapanteles gerarddelvarei Arias-Penna, 2019
 Glyptapanteles globatus (Linnaeus, 1758)
 Glyptapanteles glyphodes (Wilkinson, 1932)
 Glyptapanteles gowdeyi (Gahan, 1918)
 Glyptapanteles grantgentryi Arias-Penna, 2019
 Glyptapanteles guierae (Risbec, 1951)
 Glyptapanteles gunnarbrehmi Arias-Penna, 2019
 Glyptapanteles guyanensis (Cameron, 1911)
 Glyptapanteles haroldgreeneyi Arias-Penna, 2019
 Glyptapanteles harrisinae (Muesebeck, 1953)
 Glyptapanteles helmuthaguirrei Arias-Penna, 2019
 Glyptapanteles henryhespenheidei Arias-Penna, 2019
 Glyptapanteles henrytownesi Arias-Penna, 2019
 Glyptapanteles herbertii (Ashmead, 1900)
 Glyptapanteles horus (de Saeger, 1944)
 Glyptapanteles howelldalyi Arias-Penna, 2019
 Glyptapanteles hugokonsi Arias-Penna, 2019
 Glyptapanteles hydroeciae (You & Xiong, 1983)
 Glyptapanteles hypermnestrae Gupta & Pereira, 2012
 Glyptapanteles iangauldi Arias-Penna, 2019
 Glyptapanteles ianyarrowi Arias-Penna, 2019
 Glyptapanteles ilarisaaksjarvi Arias-Penna, 2019
 Glyptapanteles inclusus (Ratzeburg, 1844)
 Glyptapanteles indiensis (Marsh, 1979)
 Glyptapanteles intermedius (Balevski, 1980)
 Glyptapanteles intricatus (de Saeger, 1944)
 Glyptapanteles jacklonginoi Arias-Penna, 2019
 Glyptapanteles jamesrobertsoni Arias-Penna, 2019
 Glyptapanteles jaquioconnorae Arias-Penna, 2019
 Glyptapanteles jeremydewaardi Arias-Penna, 2019
 Glyptapanteles jerrypowelli Arias-Penna, 2019
 Glyptapanteles jesusugaldei Arias-Penna, 2019
 Glyptapanteles jimmilleri Arias-Penna, 2019
 Glyptapanteles jjrodriguezae Arias-Penna, 2019
 Glyptapanteles johnburnsi Arias-Penna, 2019
 Glyptapanteles johnheratyi Arias-Penna, 2019
 Glyptapanteles johnlasallei Arias-Penna, 2019
 Glyptapanteles johnnoyesi Arias-Penna, 2019
 Glyptapanteles johnstiremani Arias-Penna, 2019
 Glyptapanteles josesimbanai Arias-Penna, 2019
 Glyptapanteles juanvargasi Arias-Penna, 2019
 Glyptapanteles jumamuturii Arias-Penna, 2019
 Glyptapanteles keithwillmotti Arias-Penna, 2019
 Glyptapanteles kevinjohnsoni Arias-Penna, 2019
 Glyptapanteles kyleparksi Arias-Penna, 2019
 Glyptapanteles lamborni (Wilkinson, 1928)
 Glyptapanteles lamprosemae (Wilkinson, 1928)
 Glyptapanteles laxatus (Wilkinson, 1930)
 Glyptapanteles lefevrei (de Saeger, 1941)
 Glyptapanteles leucotretae (Ullyett, 1946)
 Glyptapanteles linghsiuae Arias-Penna, 2019
 Glyptapanteles liparidis (Bouché, 1834)
 Glyptapanteles lissopleurus (de Saeger, 1944)
 Glyptapanteles longiantennatus (You & Xiong, 1987)
 Glyptapanteles longistigma Chen & Song, 2004
 Glyptapanteles longivena Chen & Song, 2004
 Glyptapanteles lubomasneri Arias-Penna, 2019
 Glyptapanteles luchosalagajei Arias-Penna, 2019
 Glyptapanteles luciana (Nixon, 1973)
 Glyptapanteles lucidus (Sharma, 1972)
 Glyptapanteles luteipennis (Muesebeck, 1921)
 Glyptapanteles maculitarsis (Cameron, 1905)
 Glyptapanteles madecassus (Granger, 1949)
 Glyptapanteles majalis (Wesmael, 1837)
 Glyptapanteles malleyneae Arias-Penna, 2019
 Glyptapanteles malloryvanwyngaardenae Arias-Penna, 2019
 Glyptapanteles malthacae (Muesebeck, 1958)
 Glyptapanteles mamiae Arias-Penna, 2019
 Glyptapanteles marcelotavaresi Arias-Penna, 2019
 Glyptapanteles marcepsteini Arias-Penna, 2019
 Glyptapanteles marcpolleti Arias-Penna, 2019
 Glyptapanteles marjorietownesae Arias-Penna, 2019
 Glyptapanteles markshawi Arias-Penna, 2019
 Glyptapanteles marquesi (Brèthes, 1924)
 Glyptapanteles marshawheelerae Arias-Penna, 2019
 Glyptapanteles meganmiltonae Arias-Penna, 2019
 Glyptapanteles megistusocellus Song & Chen, 2004
 Glyptapanteles mehrdadhajibabaei Arias-Penna, 2019
 Glyptapanteles melanotus (de Saeger, 1944)
 Glyptapanteles melissus (de Saeger, 1944)
 Glyptapanteles menander (Nixon, 1973)
 Glyptapanteles merope (Nixon, 1965)
 Glyptapanteles michelleduennesae Arias-Penna, 2019
 Glyptapanteles mikegatesi Arias-Penna, 2019
 Glyptapanteles mikepoguei Arias-Penna, 2019
 Glyptapanteles mikeschauffi Arias-Penna, 2019
 Glyptapanteles mikesharkeyi Arias-Penna, 2019
 Glyptapanteles militaris (Walsh, 1861)
 Glyptapanteles minor Ashmead, 1906
 Glyptapanteles mnesampela Austin, 2000
 Glyptapanteles montywoodi Arias-Penna, 2019
 Glyptapanteles muesebecki (Blanchard, 1947)
 Glyptapanteles mygdonia (Nixon, 1973)
 Glyptapanteles naromae (Risbec, 1951)
 Glyptapanteles nataliaivanovae Arias-Penna, 2019
 Glyptapanteles nealweberi Arias-Penna, 2019
 Glyptapanteles neoliparidis Chen & Song, 2004
 Glyptapanteles nepitae (Wilkinson, 1934)
 Glyptapanteles nigerrimus (Roman, 1924)
 Glyptapanteles nigrescens (Cameron, 1906)
 Glyptapanteles nigricornis (Muesebeck, 1921)
 Glyptapanteles ninazitaniae Arias-Penna, 2019
 Glyptapanteles ninus (de Saeger, 1944)
 Glyptapanteles nivalis (Papp, 1983)
 Glyptapanteles nkuli (de Saeger, 1941)
 Glyptapanteles obliquae (Wilkinson, 1928)
 Glyptapanteles octonarius (Ratzeburg, 1852)
 Glyptapanteles operculinae (Fullaway, 1941)
 Glyptapanteles pachopinasi Arias-Penna, 2019
 Glyptapanteles palabundus (Tobias, 1986)
 Glyptapanteles pallipes (Reinhard, 1880)
 Glyptapanteles pamitchellae Arias-Penna, 2019
 Glyptapanteles parasundanus (Bhatnagar, 1950)
 Glyptapanteles paulhansoni Arias-Penna, 2019
 Glyptapanteles paulheberti Arias-Penna, 2019
 Glyptapanteles paulhurdi Arias-Penna, 2019
 Glyptapanteles penelope (Nixon, 1965)
 Glyptapanteles penelopeus (Tobias, 1986)
 Glyptapanteles penthocratus (Austin, 1987)
 Glyptapanteles petermarzi Arias-Penna, 2019
 Glyptapanteles phildevriesi Arias-Penna, 2019
 Glyptapanteles philippinensis (Ashmead, 1904)
 Glyptapanteles philocampus (Cameron, 1911)
 Glyptapanteles philwardi Arias-Penna, 2019
 Glyptapanteles phoebe (Nixon, 1965)
 Glyptapanteles phragmataeciae (You & Zhou, 1990)
 Glyptapanteles phytometraduplus (Shenefelt, 1972)
 Glyptapanteles phytometrae (Wilkinson, 1928)
 Glyptapanteles pinicola (Lyle, 1917)
 Glyptapanteles politus (Riley, 1881)
 Glyptapanteles popovi (Telenga, 1955)
 Glyptapanteles porthetriae (Muesebeck, 1928)
 Glyptapanteles praesens (Muesebeck, 1947)
 Glyptapanteles propylae (de Saeger, 1941)
 Glyptapanteles pseudacraeae Donaldson, 1991
 Glyptapanteles pseudotsugae Fernandez-Triana, 2018
 Glyptapanteles puera (Wilkinson, 1928)
 Glyptapanteles rafamanitioi Arias-Penna, 2019
 Glyptapanteles ripus (Papp, 1983)
 Glyptapanteles robbinthorpi Arias-Penna, 2019
 Glyptapanteles ronaldzunigai Arias-Penna, 2019
 Glyptapanteles roysnellingi Arias-Penna, 2019
 Glyptapanteles rubens (Reinhard, 1880)
 Glyptapanteles sagmaria (Nixon, 1965)
 Glyptapanteles salepus (Papp, 1983)
 Glyptapanteles sarrothripae (Weed, 1887)
 Glyptapanteles scottmilleri Arias-Penna, 2019
 Glyptapanteles scottshawi Arias-Penna, 2019
 Glyptapanteles seydeli (de Saeger, 1941)
 Glyptapanteles shelbystedenfeldae Arias-Penna, 2019
 Glyptapanteles sibiricus (Papp, 1983)
 Glyptapanteles siderion (Nixon, 1965)
 Glyptapanteles simus (de Saeger, 1944)
 Glyptapanteles sondrawardae Arias-Penna, 2019
 Glyptapanteles speciosissimus (Granger, 1949)
 Glyptapanteles spilosomae (de Saeger, 1941)
 Glyptapanteles spodopterae Ahmad, 2009
 Glyptapanteles stackelbergi (Telenga, 1955)
 Glyptapanteles stephaniecluttsae Arias-Penna, 2019
 Glyptapanteles stephaniekirkae Arias-Penna, 2019
 Glyptapanteles subpunctatus (Granger, 1949)
 Glyptapanteles sujeevanratnasinghami Arias-Penna, 2019
 Glyptapanteles suniae Arias-Penna, 2019
 Glyptapanteles sureshnaiki Arias-Penna, 2019
 Glyptapanteles suzannegreenae Arias-Penna, 2019
 Glyptapanteles sydneycameronae Arias-Penna, 2019
 Glyptapanteles taniaariasae Arias-Penna, 2019
 Glyptapanteles tanyadapkeyae Arias-Penna, 2019
 Glyptapanteles taylori (Wilkinson, 1928)
 Glyptapanteles theivorae (Shenefelt, 1972)
 Glyptapanteles thespis (de Saeger, 1944)
 Glyptapanteles thibautdelsinnei Arias-Penna, 2019
 Glyptapanteles thomaspapei Arias-Penna, 2019
 Glyptapanteles thompsoni (Lyle, 1927)
 Glyptapanteles thoseae (Wilkinson, 1934)
 Glyptapanteles toluagunbiadeae Arias-Penna, 2019
 Glyptapanteles tomwallai Arias-Penna, 2019
 Glyptapanteles trilochae Gupta, 2013
 Glyptapanteles vafer (Nixon, 1965)
 Glyptapanteles venustus (de Saeger, 1944)
 Glyptapanteles victoriapookae Arias-Penna, 2019
 Glyptapanteles vitripennis (Curtis, 1830)
 Glyptapanteles websteri (Muesebeck, 1921)
 Glyptapanteles wilkinsoni (Fahringer, 1936)
 Glyptapanteles wilmersimbanai Arias-Penna, 2019
 Glyptapanteles wonyoungchoi Arias-Penna, 2019
 Glyptapanteles yalizhangae Arias-Penna, 2019
 Glyptapanteles yanayacuensis Arias-Penna, 2019

References

Glyptapanteles